Fair Warning is the debut studio album released by the hard rock band Fair Warning.

Track listing
All songs written by Ule W. Ritgen except where noted.
 "Longing For Love" – 3:51
 "When Love Fails" – 3:43 (Helge Engelke)
 "The Call of the Heart" – 4:15
 "Crazy" – 3:50
 "One Step Closer" – 4:00 (Engelke)
 "Hang On" – 4:03
 "Out On the Run" – 3:55
 "Long Gone" – 4:41
 "The Eyes of Rock" – 3:47
 "Take a Look At the Future" – 3:56
 "The Heat of Emotion" – 3:03 (Zeno Roth)
 "Take Me Up" – 4:26

Personnel
Tommy Heart – vocals 
Helge Engelke – guitars, keyboards and backing vocals
Andy Malecek – guitars
Ule W. Ritgen – bass guitar and backing vocals
C. C. Behrens – drums
Bernd Kluse – backing vocals
Andrew McDermott – backing vocals
Kalle Bosel – backing vocals

Production
Mixing – Rafe McKenna
Engineer – Frank Wuttke

References

External links
Heavy Harmonies page

Fair Warning (band) albums
1992 debut albums